"Sapore di sale" (It. for "Taste of salt") is a song written and originally recorded by Italian singer Gino Paoli, in 1963.

Background
As its composer also corroborated, "Sapore di sale" was composed in Capo d'Orlando, Sicily, "in a deserted house near a deserted beach," where Paoli was to hold concerts in a dance hall with his band and the venue's owner invited them to extend their stay for a fortnight. At the time, Paoli was married to Anna Fabbri but was carrying on an affair with young actress Stefania Sandrelli, the affair resulting in the birth of daughter Amanda Sandrelli. As Sandrelli claimed, "Sapore di sale" was inspired by her.

Production
The song was recorded in Rome in 1963, on an arrangement by Ennio Morricone who also conducted the orchestra. Gato Barbieri  performed the sax solo.

Release
The song was released as a single in 1963 by RCA Italiana. Paoli entered the  Cantagiro music festival with it.

Notable covers 
Gino Paoli had some success in Spain where, in October 1964,his Spanish-language version reached the 8th place in the hit parade.

References

1963 songs
1963 singles
Italian-language songs
Number-one singles in Italy
Gino Paoli songs
RCA Records singles